Jahid Jahim (born 29 May 1958) is a Malaysian politician who has served as State Minister of Rural Development of Sabah in the Gabungan Rakyat Sabah (GRS) state administration under Chief Minister Hajiji Noor since September 2020 and Member of the Sabah State Legislative Assembly (MLA) for Tamparuli since May 2018 and from March 2004 to May 2013. He also served as State Assistant Minister of Youth and Sports from 2004 to 2013 and State Minister of Housing and Local Government briefly in 2018. He is a member of the United Sabah Party (PBS), a component party of the ruling GRS coalition. He has served as the Deputy President of PBS for the Muslim Bumiputera quota since January 2021 and formerly served as the Secretary-General of PBS from 2018 to 2021.  He had previously contested in the elections as a direct candidate of another ruling Barisan Nasional (BN) coalition before PBS decided to leave BN on 12 May 2018.

Election results

Honours 
  :
  Officer of the Order of the Defender of the Realm (KMN) (2006)
  Companion of the Order of the Defender of the Realm (JMN) (2014)
  :
  Member of the Order of Kinabalu (ADK) (1981)
  Companion of the Order of Kinabalu (ASDK) (1994)
  Commander of the Order of Kinabalu (PGDK) – Datuk (2008)

References 

United Sabah Party politicians
People from Sabah
Living people
1958 births
Malaysian Muslims
Kadazan-Dusun people
Officers of the Order of the Defender of the Realm
Companions of the Order of the Defender of the Realm
Commanders of the Order of Kinabalu